Events in the year 1626 in Spain.

Incumbents 
King: Philip IV

Art & Literature 

 El Buscón by Francisco de Quevedo is published without Quevedo's permission. Previously, it had circulated in manuscript form.

Deaths 
 October 2 – Diego Sarmiento de Acuña, conde de Gondomar, Spanish diplomat (born 1567)

References

 
Years of the 17th century in Spain